A metamaterial (from the Greek word μετά meta, meaning "beyond" or "after", and the Latin word materia, meaning "matter" or "material") is any material engineered to have a property that is not found in naturally occurring materials. They are made from assemblies of multiple elements fashioned from composite materials such as metals and plastics. These materials are usually arranged in repeating patterns, at scales that are smaller than the wavelengths of the phenomena they influence. Metamaterials derive their properties not from the properties of the base materials, but from their newly designed structures. Their precise shape, geometry, size, orientation and arrangement gives them their smart properties capable of manipulating electromagnetic waves: by blocking, absorbing, enhancing, or bending waves, to achieve benefits that go beyond what is possible with conventional materials.

Appropriately designed metamaterials can affect waves of electromagnetic radiation or sound in a manner not observed in bulk materials. Those that exhibit a negative index of refraction for particular wavelengths have been the focus of a large amount of research. These materials are known as negative-index metamaterials.

Potential applications of metamaterials are diverse and include optical filters, medical devices, remote aerospace applications, sensor detection and infrastructure monitoring, smart solar power management, Lasers, crowd control, radomes, high-frequency battlefield communication and lenses for high-gain antennas, improving ultrasonic sensors, and even shielding structures from earthquakes. Metamaterials offer the potential to create super-lenses.  Such a lens can allow imaging below the diffraction limit that is the minimum resolution d=λ/(2NA) that can be achieved by conventional lenses having a numerical aperture NA and with illumination wavelength λ. Sub-wavelength optical metamaterials, when integrated with optical recording media, can be used to achieve optical data density higher than limited by diffraction.  A form of 'invisibility' was demonstrated using gradient-index materials. Acoustic and seismic metamaterials are also research areas.

Metamaterial research is interdisciplinary and involves such fields as electrical engineering, electromagnetics, classical optics, solid state physics, microwave and antenna engineering, optoelectronics, material sciences, nanoscience and semiconductor engineering.

History

Explorations of artificial materials for manipulating electromagnetic waves began at the end of the 19th century. Some of the earliest structures that may be considered metamaterials were studied by Jagadish Chandra Bose, who in 1898 researched substances with chiral properties. Karl Ferdinand Lindman studied wave interaction with metallic helices as artificial chiral media in the early twentieth century.

In the late 1940s, Winston E. Kock from AT&T Bell Laboratories developed materials that had similar characteristics to metamaterials. In the 1950s and 1960s, artificial dielectrics were studied for lightweight microwave antennas. Microwave radar absorbers were researched in the 1980s and 1990s as applications for artificial chiral media.

Negative-index materials were first described theoretically by Victor Veselago in 1967. He proved that such materials could transmit light. He showed that the phase velocity could be made anti-parallel to the direction of Poynting vector. This is contrary to wave propagation in naturally occurring materials.

In 1995, John M. Guerra fabricated a sub-wavelength transparent grating (later called a photonic metamaterial)  having 50 nm lines and spaces, and then coupled it with a standard oil immersion microscope objective (the combination later called a super-lens) to resolve a grating in a silicon wafer also having 50 nm lines and spaces. This super-resolved image was achieved with illumination having a wavelength of 650 nm in air.

In 2000, John Pendry was the first to identify a practical way to make a left-handed metamaterial, a material in which the right-hand rule is not followed. Such a material allows an electromagnetic wave to convey energy (have a group velocity) against its phase velocity. Pendry's idea was that metallic wires aligned along the direction of a wave could provide negative permittivity (dielectric function ε < 0). Natural materials (such as ferroelectrics) display negative permittivity; the challenge was achieving negative permeability (µ < 0). In 1999 Pendry demonstrated that a split ring (C shape) with its axis placed along the direction of wave propagation could do so. In the same paper, he showed that a periodic array of wires and rings could give rise to a negative refractive index. Pendry also proposed a related negative-permeability design, the Swiss roll.

In 2000, David R. Smith et al. reported the experimental demonstration of functioning electromagnetic metamaterials by horizontally stacking, periodically, split-ring resonators and thin wire structures. A method was provided in 2002 to realize negative-index metamaterials using artificial lumped-element loaded transmission lines in microstrip technology. In 2003, complex (both real and imaginary parts of) negative refractive index  and imaging by flat lens using left handed metamaterials were demonstrated. By 2007, experiments that involved negative refractive index had been conducted by many groups. At microwave frequencies, the first, imperfect invisibility cloak was realized in 2006.

Electromagnetic metamaterials

An electromagnetic metamaterial affects electromagnetic waves that impinge on or interact with its structural features, which are smaller than the wavelength. To behave as a homogeneous material accurately described by an effective refractive index, its features must be much smaller than the wavelength.

For microwave radiation, the features are on the order of millimeters. Microwave frequency metamaterials are usually constructed as arrays of electrically conductive elements (such as loops of wire) that have suitable inductive and capacitive characteristics. Many microwave metamaterials use split-ring resonators.

Photonic metamaterials are structured on the nanometer scale and manipulate light at optical frequencies. Photonic crystals and frequency-selective surfaces such as diffraction gratings, dielectric mirrors and optical coatings exhibit similarities to subwavelength structured metamaterials. However, these are usually considered distinct from metamaterials, as their function arises from diffraction or interference and thus cannot be approximated as a homogeneous material. However, material structures such as photonic crystals are effective in the visible light spectrum. The middle of the visible spectrum has a wavelength of approximately 560 nm (for sunlight). Photonic crystal structures are generally half this size or smaller, that is <280 nm. 

Plasmonic metamaterials utilize surface plasmons, which are packets of electrical charge that collectively oscillate at the surfaces of metals at optical frequencies.

Frequency selective surfaces (FSS) can exhibit subwavelength characteristics and are known variously as artificial magnetic conductors (AMC) or High Impedance Surfaces (HIS). FSS display inductive and capacitive characteristics that are directly related to their subwavelength structure.

Electromagnetic metamaterials can be divided into different classes, as follows:

Negative refractive index

Negative-index metamaterials (NIM) are characterized by a negative index of refraction. Other terms for NIMs include "left-handed media", "media with a negative refractive index", and "backward-wave media". NIMs where the negative index of refraction arises from simultaneously negative permittivity and negative permeability are also known as double negative metamaterials or double negative materials (DNG).

Assuming a material well-approximated by a real permittivity and permeability, the relationship between permittivity , permeability  and refractive index n is given by
. By convention the positive square root is used for n. Because the product  is positive, n is real. Under such circumstances, it is necessary to take the negative square root for n. Such materials are opaque for electromagnetic radiation and examples include plasmonic materials such as metals (gold, silver, ...).

The real parts of both  and  do not have to be negative for a passive material to display negative refraction. Indeed, a negative refractive index for circularly polarized waves can also arise from chirality. Metamaterials with negative n have numerous interesting properties:
Snell's law (n1sinθ1 = n2sinθ2) still describes refraction, but as n2 is negative, incident and refracted rays are on the same side of the surface normal at an interface of positive and negative index materials.
Cherenkov radiation points the other way.
The time-averaged Poynting vector is antiparallel to phase velocity. However, for waves (energy) to propagate, a –µ must be paired with a –ε in order to satisfy the wave number dependence on the material parameters .

Negative index of refraction derives mathematically from the vector triplet E, H and k.

For plane waves propagating in electromagnetic metamaterials, the electric field, magnetic field and wave vector follow a left-hand rule, the reverse of the behavior of conventional optical materials.

To date, only metamaterials exhibit a negative index of refraction.

Single negative
Single negative (SNG) metamaterials have either negative relative permittivity (εr) or negative relative permeability (µr), but not both. They act as metamaterials when combined with a different, complementary SNG, jointly acting as a DNG.

Epsilon negative media (ENG) display a negative εr  while µr is positive. Many plasmas exhibit this characteristic. For example, noble metals such as gold or silver are ENG in the infrared and visible spectrums.

Mu-negative media (MNG) display a positive εr  and negative µr. Gyrotropic or gyromagnetic materials exhibit this characteristic. A gyrotropic material is one that has been altered by the presence of a quasistatic magnetic field, enabling a magneto-optic effect. A magneto-optic effect is a phenomenon in which an electromagnetic wave propagates through such a medium. In such a material, left- and right-rotating elliptical polarizations can propagate at different speeds. When light is transmitted through a layer of magneto-optic material, the result is called the Faraday effect: the polarization plane can be rotated, forming a Faraday rotator. The results of such a reflection are known as the magneto-optic Kerr effect (not to be confused with the nonlinear Kerr effect). Two gyrotropic materials with reversed rotation directions of the two principal polarizations are called optical isomers.

Joining a slab of ENG material and slab of MNG material resulted in properties such as resonances, anomalous tunneling, transparency and zero reflection. Like negative-index materials, SNGs are innately dispersive, so their εr, µr and refraction index n, are a function of frequency.

Hyperbolic 
Hyperbolic metamaterials (HMMs) behave as a metal for certain polarization or direction of light propagation and behave as a dielectric for the other due to the negative and positive permittivity tensor components, giving extreme anisotropy. The material's dispersion relation in wavevector space forms a hyperboloid and therefore it is called a hyperbolic metamaterial. The extreme anisotropy of HMMs leads to directional propagation of light within and on the surface.  HMMs have showed various potential applications, such as sensing, reflection modulator, imaging, steering of optical signals, enhanced plasmon resonance effects.

Bandgap 

Electromagnetic bandgap metamaterials (EBG or EBM) control light propagation. This is accomplished either with photonic crystals (PC) or left-handed materials (LHM). PCs can prohibit light propagation altogether. Both classes can allow light to propagate in specific, designed directions and both can be designed with bandgaps at desired frequencies. The period size of EBGs is an appreciable fraction of the wavelength, creating constructive and destructive interference.

PC are distinguished from sub-wavelength structures, such as tunable metamaterials, because the PC derives its properties from its bandgap characteristics. PCs are sized to match the wavelength of light, versus other metamaterials that expose sub-wavelength structure. Furthermore, PCs function by diffracting light. In contrast, metamaterial does not use diffraction.

PCs have periodic inclusions that inhibit wave propagation due to the inclusions' destructive interference from scattering. The photonic bandgap property of PCs makes them the electromagnetic analog of electronic semi-conductor crystals.

EBGs have the goal of creating high quality, low loss, periodic, dielectric structures. An EBG affects photons in the same way semiconductor materials affect electrons. PCs are the perfect bandgap material, because they allow no light propagation. Each unit of the prescribed periodic structure acts like one atom, albeit of a much larger size.

EBGs are designed to prevent the propagation of an allocated bandwidth of frequencies, for certain arrival angles and polarizations. Various geometries and structures have been proposed to fabricate EBG's special properties. In practice it is impossible to build a flawless EBG device.

EBGs have been manufactured for frequencies ranging from a few gigahertz (GHz) to a few terahertz (THz), radio, microwave and mid-infrared frequency regions. EBG application developments include a transmission line, woodpiles made of square dielectric bars and several different types of low gain antennas.

Double positive medium
Double positive mediums (DPS) do occur in nature, such as naturally occurring dielectrics. Permittivity and magnetic permeability are both positive and wave propagation is in the forward direction. Artificial materials have been fabricated which combine DPS, ENG and MNG properties.

Bi-isotropic and bianisotropic
Categorizing metamaterials into double or single negative, or double positive, normally assumes that the metamaterial has independent electric and magnetic responses described by ε and µ. However, in many cases, the electric field causes magnetic polarization, while the magnetic field induces electrical polarization, known as magnetoelectric coupling. Such media are denoted as bi-isotropic. Media that exhibit magnetoelectric coupling and that are anisotropic (which is the case for many metamaterial structures), are referred to as bi-anisotropic.

Four material parameters are intrinsic to magnetoelectric coupling of bi-isotropic media. They are the electric (E) and magnetic (H) field strengths, and electric (D) and magnetic (B) flux densities. These parameters are ε, µ, κ and χ or permittivity, permeability, strength of chirality, and the Tellegen parameter, respectively. In this type of media, material parameters do not vary with changes along a rotated coordinate system of measurements. In this sense they are invariant or scalar.

The intrinsic magnetoelectric parameters, κ and χ, affect the phase of the wave. The effect of the chirality parameter is to split the refractive index. In isotropic media this results in wave propagation only if ε and µ have the same sign. In bi-isotropic media with χ assumed to be zero, and κ a non-zero value, different results appear. Either a backward wave or a forward wave can occur. Alternatively, two forward waves or two backward waves can occur, depending on the strength of the chirality parameter.

In the general case, the constitutive relations for bi-anisotropic materials read 

Such decomposition allows us to classify the reciprocal bianisotropic response and we can identify the following three main classes: (i)  chiral media , (ii)  pseudochiral media, (iii) omega media  .

Chiral
Handedness of metamaterials is a potential source of confusion as the metamaterial literature includes two conflicting uses of the terms left- and right-handed. The first refers to one of the two circularly polarized waves that are the propagating modes in chiral media. The second relates to the triplet of electric field, magnetic field and Poynting vector that arise in negative refractive index media, which in most cases are not chiral.

Generally a chiral and/or bianisotropic electromagnetic response is a consequence of 3D geometrical chirality: 3D-chiral metamaterials are composed by embedding 3D-chiral structures in a host medium and they show chirality-related polarization effects such as optical activity and circular dichroism. The concept of 2D chirality also exists and a planar object is said to be chiral if it cannot be superposed onto its mirror image unless it is lifted from the plane. 2D-chiral metamaterials that are anisotropic and lossy have been observed to exhibit directionally asymmetric transmission (reflection, absorption) of circularly polarized waves due to circular conversion dichrosim. On the other hand, bianisotropic response can arise from geometrical achiral structures possessing neither 2D nor 3D intrinsic chirality. Plum and colleagues investigated magneto-electric coupling due to extrinsic chirality, where the arrangement of a (achiral) structure together with the radiation wave vector is different from its mirror image, and observed large, tuneable linear optical activity, nonlinear optical activity, specular optical activity and circular conversion dichroism. Rizza et al. suggested 1D chiral metamaterials where the effective chiral tensor is not vanishing if the system is geometrically one-dimensional chiral (the mirror image of the entire structure cannot be superposed onto it by using translations without rotations).

3D-chiral metamaterials are constructed from chiral materials or resonators in which the effective chirality parameter  is non-zero. 
 This is because the refractive index  has distinct values for left and right circularly polarized waves, given by

It can be seen that a negative index will occur for one polarization if  > . In this case, it is not necessary that either or both  and  be negative for backward wave propagation. A negative refractive index due to chirality was first observed simultaneously and independently by Plum et al. and Zhang et al. in 2009.

FSS based 

Frequency selective surface-based metamaterials block signals in one waveband and pass those at another waveband. They have become an alternative to fixed frequency metamaterials. They allow for optional changes of frequencies in a single medium, rather than the restrictive limitations of a fixed frequency response.

Other types

Elastic 

These metamaterials use different parameters to achieve a negative index of refraction in materials that are not electromagnetic. Furthermore, "a new design for elastic metamaterials that can behave either as liquids or solids over a limited frequency range may enable new applications based on the control of acoustic, elastic and seismic waves." They are also called mechanical metamaterials.

Acoustic 
 

Acoustic metamaterials control, direct and manipulate sound in the form of sonic, infrasonic or ultrasonic waves in gases, liquids and solids. As with electromagnetic waves, sonic waves can exhibit negative refraction.

Control of sound waves is mostly accomplished through the bulk modulus β, mass density ρ and chirality. The bulk modulus and density are analogs of permittivity and permeability in electromagnetic metamaterials. Related to this is the mechanics of sound wave propagation in a lattice structure. Also materials have mass and intrinsic degrees of stiffness. Together, these form a resonant system and the mechanical (sonic) resonance may be excited by appropriate sonic frequencies (for example audible pulses).

Structural 
Structural metamaterials provide properties such as crushability and light weight. Using projection micro-stereolithography, microlattices can be created using forms much like trusses and girders. Materials four orders of magnitude stiffer than conventional aerogel, but with the same density have been created. Such materials can withstand a load of at least 160,000 times their own weight by over-constraining the materials.

A ceramic nanotruss metamaterial can be flattened and revert to its original state.

Thermal 
Typically materials found in nature, when homogeneous, are thermally isotropic. That is to say, heat passes through them at roughly the same rate in all directions. However, thermal metamaterials are anisotropic usually due to their highly organized internal structure. Composite materials with highly aligned internal particles or structures, such as fibers, are examples of this, for example carbon nanotubes (CNT).

Nonlinear 

Metamaterials may be fabricated that include some form of nonlinear media, whose properties change with the power of the incident wave. Nonlinear media are essential for nonlinear optics. Most optical materials have a relatively weak response, meaning that their properties change by only a small amount for large changes in the intensity of the electromagnetic field. The local electromagnetic fields of the inclusions in nonlinear metamaterials can be much larger than the average value of the field. Besides, remarkable nonlinear effects have been predicted and observed if the metamaterial effective dielectric permittivity is very small (epsilon-near-zero media). In addition, exotic properties such as a negative refractive index, create opportunities to tailor the phase matching conditions that must be satisfied in any nonlinear optical structure.

Hall metamaterials 

In 2009, Marc Briane and Graeme Milton proved mathematically that one can in principle invert the sign of a 3 materials based composite in 3D made out of only positive or negative sign Hall coefficient materials. Later in 2015 Muamer Kadic et al. showed that a simple perforation of isotropic material can lead to its change of sign of the Hall coefficient. This theoretical claim was finally experimentally demonstrated by Christian Kern et al.

In 2015, it was also demonstrated by Christian Kern et al. that an anisotropic perforation of a single material can lead to a yet more unusual effect namely the parallel Hall effect. This means that the induced electric field inside a conducting media is no longer orthogonal to the current and the magnetic field but is actually parallel to the latest.

Frequency bands

Terahertz 

Terahertz metamaterials interact at terahertz frequencies, usually defined as 0.1 to 10 THz. Terahertz radiation lies at the far end of the infrared band, just after the end of the microwave band. This corresponds to millimeter and submillimeter wavelengths between the 3 mm (EHF band) and 0.03 mm (long-wavelength edge of far-infrared light).

Photonic 

Photonic metamaterial interact with optical frequencies (mid-infrared). The sub-wavelength period distinguishes them from photonic band gap structures.

Tunable 

Tunable metamaterials allow arbitrary adjustments to frequency changes in the refractive index. A tunable metamaterial expands beyond the bandwidth limitations in left-handed materials by constructing various types of metamaterials.

Plasmonic 

Plasmonic metamaterials exploit surface plasmons, which are produced from the interaction of light with metal-dielectrics. Under specific conditions, the incident light couples with the surface plasmons to create self-sustaining, propagating electromagnetic waves or surface waves known as surface plasmon polaritons. Bulk plasma oscillations make possible the effect of negative mass (density).

Applications 

Metamaterials are under consideration for many applications. Metamaterial antennas are commercially available.

In 2007, one researcher stated that for metamaterial applications to be realized, energy loss must be reduced, materials must be extended into three-dimensional isotropic materials and production techniques must be industrialized.

Antennas 

Metamaterial antennas are a class of antennas that use metamaterials to improve performance. Demonstrations showed that metamaterials could enhance an antenna's radiated power. Materials that can attain negative permeability allow for properties such as small antenna size, high directivity and tunable frequency. Single-negative metamaterials such as meta-grid lines  can alleviate mutual coupling in closely packed MIMO antenna arrays.

Absorber 

A metamaterial absorber manipulates the loss components of metamaterials' permittivity and magnetic permeability, to absorb large amounts of electromagnetic radiation. This is a useful feature for photodetection and solar photovoltaic applications. Loss components are also relevant in applications of negative refractive index (photonic metamaterials, antenna systems) or transformation optics (metamaterial cloaking, celestial mechanics), but often are not utilized in these applications.

Superlens 

A superlens is a two or three-dimensional device that uses metamaterials, usually with negative refraction properties, to achieve resolution beyond the diffraction limit (ideally, infinite resolution). Such a behaviour is enabled by the capability of double-negative materials to yield negative phase velocity. The diffraction limit is inherent in conventional optical devices or lenses.

Cloaking devices 

Metamaterials are a potential basis for a practical cloaking device. The proof of principle was demonstrated on October 19, 2006. No practical cloaks are publicly known to exist.

RCS (Radar Cross Section) reducing metamaterials 
Conventionally, the RCS has been reduced either by Radar absorbent material (RAM) or by purpose shaping of the targets such that the scattered energy can be redirected away from the source. While RAMs have narrow frequency band functionality, purpose shaping limits the aerodynamic performance of the target. More recently, metamaterials or metasurfaces are synthesized that can redirect the scattered energy away from the source using either array theory or generalized Snell's law. This has led to aerodynamically favorable shapes for the targets with the reduced RCS.

Seismic protection 

Seismic metamaterials counteract the adverse effects of seismic waves on man-made structures.

Sound filtering 

Metamaterials textured with nanoscale wrinkles could control sound or light signals, such as changing a material's color or improving ultrasound resolution. Uses include nondestructive material testing, medical diagnostics and sound suppression. The materials can be made through a high-precision, multi-layer deposition process. The thickness of each layer can be controlled within a fraction of a wavelength. The material is then compressed, creating precise wrinkles whose spacing can cause scattering of selected frequencies.

Guided mode manipulations 
Metamaterials can be integrated with optical waveguides to tailor guided electromagnetic waves (meta-waveguide). Subwavelength structures like metamaterials can be integrated with for instance silicon waveguides to develop and polarization beam splitters and optical couplers, adding new degrees of freedom of controlling light propagation at nanoscale for integrated photonic devices. Other applications such as integrated mode convertors, polarization (de)multiplexers, structured light generation, and on-chip bio-sensors can be developed.

Theoretical models

All materials are made of atoms, which are dipoles. These dipoles modify light velocity by a factor n (the refractive index). In a split ring resonator the ring and wire units act as atomic dipoles: the wire acts as a ferroelectric atom, while the ring acts as an inductor L, while the open section acts as a capacitor C. The ring as a whole acts as an LC circuit. When the electromagnetic field passes through the ring, an induced current is created. The generated field is perpendicular to the light's magnetic field. The magnetic resonance results in a negative permeability; the refraction index is negative as well. (The lens is not truly flat, since the structure's capacitance imposes a slope for the electric induction.)

Several (mathematical) material models frequency response in DNGs. One of these is the Lorentz model, which describes electron motion in terms of a driven-damped, harmonic oscillator. The Debye relaxation model applies when the acceleration component of the Lorentz mathematical model is small compared to the other components of the equation. The Drude model applies when the restoring force component is negligible and the coupling coefficient is generally the plasma frequency. Other component distinctions call for the use of one of these models, depending on its polarity or purpose.

Three-dimensional composites of metal/non-metallic inclusions periodically/randomly embedded in a low permittivity matrix are usually modeled by analytical methods, including mixing formulas and scattering-matrix based methods. The particle is modeled by either an electric dipole parallel to the electric field or a pair of crossed electric and magnetic dipoles parallel to the electric and magnetic fields, respectively, of the applied wave. These dipoles are the leading terms in the multipole series. They are the only existing ones for a homogeneous sphere, whose polarizability can be easily obtained from the Mie scattering coefficients. In general, this procedure is known as the "point-dipole approximation", which is a good approximation for metamaterials consisting of composites of electrically small spheres. Merits of these methods include low calculation cost and mathematical simplicity.

Three conceptions- negative-index medium, non-reflecting crystal and superlens are foundations of the metamaterial theory. Other first principles techniques for analyzing triply-periodic electromagnetic media may be found in Computing photonic band structure

Institutional networks

MURI
The Multidisciplinary University Research Initiative (MURI) encompasses dozens of Universities and a few government organizations. Participating universities include UC Berkeley, UC Los Angeles, UC San Diego, Massachusetts Institute of Technology, and Imperial College in London. The sponsors are Office of Naval Research and the Defense Advanced Research Project Agency.

MURI supports research that intersects more than one traditional science and engineering discipline to accelerate both research and translation to applications. As of 2009, 69 academic institutions were expected to participate in 41 research efforts.

Metamorphose
The Virtual Institute for Artificial Electromagnetic Materials and Metamaterials "Metamorphose VI AISBL" is an international association to promote artificial electromagnetic materials and metamaterials. It organizes scientific conferences, supports specialized journals, creates and manages research programs, provides training programs (including PhD and training programs for industrial partners); and technology transfer to European Industry.

See also

Metasurface
Artificial dielectrics—macroscopic analogues of naturally occurring dielectrics that came into use with the radar microwave technologies developed between the 1940s and 1970s.
METATOY (Metamaterial for rays)—composed of super-wavelength structures, such as small arrays of prisms and lenses and can operate over a broad band of frequencies
Magnonics
Metamaterials (journal)
Metamaterials Handbook
Metamaterials: Physics and Engineering Explorations

References

External links

Electromagnetism
 
Articles containing video clips